Headley is a surname. Notable people with the surname include:

Chase Headley (born 1984), American professional baseball player
David Headley (born 1960), Pakistani-American terrorist
Dean Headley (born 1970), cricketer
Frederick Webb Headley (1856–1919), English naturalist
George Headley (1909–1983), West Indian cricketer
Heather Headley (born 1974), Trinidadian-American musician
Hubert Klyne Headley (1906–1996), American composer and musician
Josephine Headley (1891-?), American silent film actress
Justina Headley (born 1968), Taiwanese-American author
Ron Headley (born 1939), West Indian cricketer
Shari Headley  (born 1964), American Actress
Victor Headley (born 1959), British author
Win Headley (born 1949), American football player

See also
Headlee
Hedley (surname)

English-language surnames